James Clinton "JC" Schoonmaker (born April 12, 2000) is an American cross-country skier. He competed in the sprint at the 2022 Winter Olympics. He competes collegiately for the University of Alaska Anchorage.

Cross-country skiing results
All results are sourced from the International Ski Federation (FIS).

Olympic Games

Distance reduced to 30 km due to weather conditions.

World Championships

World Cup

Season standings

References

External links

2000 births
Living people
American male cross-country skiers
Cross-country skiers at the 2022 Winter Olympics
Olympic cross-country skiers of the United States
People from Truckee, California